Joshua Child (died c. 1831-32) was a justice of the Supreme Court of Mississippi from 1825 to 1831.

A native of New England, Child was "well educated in the various schools of science before entering upon the study of law". He moved to Mississippi around the time of the organization of the state in 1817. He practiced law in Natchez, Mississippi, quickly gaining an excellent reputation, until his appointment to the state supreme court in 1825.

His opinions from the bench "were delivered in a lucid, terse, and forcible manner, free from all prolixity or effort at display, and resting upon the authority of the court rather than upon an array of reported decisions". As a justice, however, "he began to yield to a propensity to drink, which his sociability and natural ardor of temperament greatly aggravated". Various incidents were reported as arising from this. On one occasion it was said that "while under the influence of drink he became angry with some of the members of the bar, and to vent his rage, at the close of the term he ordered an adjournment, mounted his horse, and rode away without signing the minutes of the court". On another occasion, he engaged in a duel with General John B. Joor, "in which both parties were severely wounded". In 1828, the legislature convened a committee "to investigate the possibility of impeaching Child", but this did  manifest any results. Ultimately, he "fell into habits of dissipation and resigned". Following Child's resignation from the court, Alexander Montgomery, William L. Sharkey, and Josiah C. Smith were put forth as candidates put forth for the seat, with Montgomery winning the vote.

Child never married, and "strongly manifested the peculiarities usually belonging to those who grow old in celibacy". He died not long after his resignation from the bench. In 1844, the Mississippi Legislature enacted a personal bill to permit a "free man of color" named Berry, identified as "formerly the confidential body servant of the late Judge Joshua Child", to remain in that status in Hinds County, Mississippi.

See also
List of justices of the Supreme Court of Mississippi

References

18th-century births
Date of birth unknown
1830s deaths
Year of birth unknown
Year of death uncertain
People from New England
Justices of the Mississippi Supreme Court